The Pennsylvania State Office Building is a historic office building located in the Hahnemann neighborhood of Philadelphia, Pennsylvania. It was built between 1957 and 1958, and is an 18-story, steel frame and reinforced concrete building.

History
Philadelphia's application to place the Pennsylvania State Office Building on the National Register of Historic Places was reviewed by the Historic Preservation Board of the Pennsylvania Historical and Museum Commission at its meeting on October 6, 2009, along with applications for: the Hamburg Historic District in Hamburg, Pennsylvania, the Hamnett Historic District in Wilkinsburg, Pennsylvania, the Newville Historic District in Newville, Pennsylvania, the Philadelphia Quartermaster Depot in Philadelphia, the Experimental and Safety Research Coal Mines in Allegheny County's South Park Township, and the Cheney Farm, Hopewell Farm, and Chandler Mill Road Bridge in Chester County. 

The Pennsylvania State Office Building was then officially listed on the National Register of Historic Places later in 2010.

Architectural features
The historic Pennsylvania State Office Building is clad in white marble exterior panels and measures 63 feet by 259 feet. Its style is reflective of the Modern movement. The building is surrounded by a group of formal concrete plazas. At one end is a black granite fountain with a double concave shape.

This building was added to the National Register of Historic Places in 2010.

Gallery

References

Government buildings on the National Register of Historic Places in Philadelphia
Government buildings completed in 1958